Kari Matchett is a Canadian actress. She is known for her roles as Colleen Blessed on Power Play, as Joan Campbell on Covert Affairs and as Kate Filmore in the science fiction movie Cube 2: Hypercube. She has also appeared in films such as Apartment Hunting (2000), Angel Eyes (2001), Men with Brooms (2002), Cypher (2002), Civic Duty (2006), The Tree of Life (2011), and Maudie (2016).

Early life and education

Matchett was born in Spalding, Saskatchewan. She attended high school at Lethbridge Collegiate Institute in Lethbridge, Alberta. She attended the National Theatre School in Montreal and the Moscow Theatre School.

Matchett performed on stage for three years at the Stratford Shakespeare Festival in Ontario.

Career

In Canada, her first major role was on The Rez, and her first starring role was as Colleen Blessed in Power Play (1998–2000). Matchett was a cast member on the A&E Network TV series A Nero Wolfe Mystery (2001–2002), with Timothy Hutton in which she played several characters, including a recurring role as Lily Rowan. On Wonderfalls, she played Beth, the bisexual love interest of the main character's lesbian sister.

In 2001, she played Candace in the drama film Angel Eyes. In 2002, she played Kate Filmore in the science fiction horror thriller Cube 2: Hypercube.

In 2003, she starred with Timothy Hutton in the Syfy miniseries Five Days to Midnight. Her next role was as Detective Elaine Bender in Blue Murder in 2004. She previously guest starred on Blue Murder in 2001 as a suspect in a murder investigation, for which she won a Gemini Award.

In 2005, Matchett starred in the ABC series Invasion, about aliens taking the form of humans. She also appeared in Plague City: SARS in Toronto. She also appeared as Mary Tate on Studio 60 on the Sunset Strip. She appeared in both Shark and Wild Card. She played a single mother stalked by her boyfriend in Intimate Stranger, in 2006. In the same year she starred with Peter Krause in Civic Duty.

In 2007, Matchett joined the cast of 24, as Lisa Miller. In June 2007, she played Kate Armstrong in the TNT series Heartland. In 2007 and 2008, she was cast as ER chief Skye Wexler on ER. In 2008 and 2009, she played Dennis Hopper's character's daughter, Jules, in the critically acclaimed Starz series Crash. She had a recurring role in the TNT series Leverage, reuniting with Nero Wolfe co-star Timothy Hutton, portraying Maggie Collins, the ex-wife of Hutton's character, Nathan "Nate" Ford. Matchett starred as Joan Campbell in the USA Network series Covert Affairs (2010–2014).

In 2016, Matchett appeared as Sandra in Maudie with Ethan Hawke. She also played a supporting role in Terrence Malick's The Tree of Life, with Sean Penn and Brad Pitt. Shot in 2008, the film premiered in competition at the Cannes Film Festival in May 2011 and received the Palme d'Or.

Filmography

Film

Television

Awards and nominations

References

External links
 
 

1970 births
Canadian television actresses
Canadian film actresses
Living people
National Theatre School of Canada alumni
Actresses from Saskatchewan
Nero Wolfe
21st-century Canadian actresses
20th-century Canadian actresses